The Teréga Open Pau–Pyrénées is a professional tennis tournament played on indoor hard courts. It is currently part of the ATP Challenger Tour. It is held annually in Pau, France since 2019.

Past finals

Singles

Doubles

References

External links
Official website
ATP Challenger website

ATP Challenger Tour
Hard court tennis tournaments
Tennis tournaments in France
Sport in Pau, Pyrénées-Atlantiques
Recurring sporting events established in 2019